Deep Cuts, Volume 3 (1984–1995) is a compilation of Queen featuring some of their lesser-known tracks from between 1984 and 1995. Deep Cuts Volume 3 was released on 5 September 2011, as part of Queen's 40th Anniversary, simultaneously with the third group of five reissues of Queen studio albums (The Works, A Kind of Magic, The Miracle, Innuendo and Made in Heaven) from which the songs are sampled. In this release, "Khashoggi's Ship" has a drum intro (to separate it from the song "Party", which was not included in this compilation) and "It's a Beautiful Day (Reprise)" starts with 15 seconds of slow build-up and ends with "Yeah" (which is a separate track on Made in Heaven). The release date of the album would have also been former lead singer Freddie Mercury's 65th birthday.

Track listing

References

2011 compilation albums
Queen (band) compilation albums
Island Records compilation albums